The Burma pipistrelle (Hypsugo lophurus) is a species of vesper bat in the family Vespertilionidae found in Myanmar. It is known only from Maliwun in Tanintharyi Region.

Sources

Hypsugo
Taxonomy articles created by Polbot
Taxa named by Oldfield Thomas
Bats of Southeast Asia
Mammals described in 1915